Gendərə or Gëndere may refer to:
 Gendərə, Ismailli, Azerbaijan
 Gendərə, Yardymli, Azerbaijan